The 2013 Formula Masters China season is the third season of the Formula Pilota China series, and the first under the Formula Masters China branding. It was also the first season with one-make Volkswagen 2.0 engines. The championship began on 10 May at Zhuhai and will finish on 10 November at Guia Circuit in Macau after nineteen races held at seven meetings.

Teams and drivers
 All cars are Volkswagen-engined Tatuus FA010 chassis.

Race calendar and results

Standings

Drivers' championship
 Points for both championships were awarded as follows:

Notes:
† — No points are awarded for the non-championship Macau Grand Prix event.

Teams

References

External links

Formula Masters China seasons
Formula Masters China season
Formula Masters China season
Masters China